Pyeongchon station is a railway station on the Gyeongjeon Line in Jinju, South Korea.

Defunct railway stations in South Korea